Events from the year 1608 in Quebec.

Events 
 The first group of French settlers arrive in what is today Tadoussac, marking the beginning of a continuous Francophone presence in North America.
 Quebec City is founded.  The first city in New France begins as a fortified point. Constructions are begun on July 3 under Samuel de Champlain.

Births 
John Milton was born in London on December 9, 1608, to John and Sara Milton.

Deaths

References 

1600s in Canada
Quebec, 1608 In
Years in Quebec